The Turvasu dynasty, Druhyu dynasty and the Anu dynasty are the names of three legendary cadet branches of the Lunar dynasty in Hindu literature, featured in the Puranas and the epics Ramayana and Mahabharata.

Legend 
According to Hindu mythology, King Yayati surreptitiously married the daitya princess and his wife Devayani's maid, Sharmistha, after she begged him to bear her children. When Devayani learnt of her husband's infidelity to her, she hastened to inform her father, the sage Shukra. Angered, Shukra cursed his son-in-law with premature old age and infirmity. When Yayati begged him to temper the curse, the sage consented, allowing him to exchange its consequences with one of his sons. Yayati asked each of his sons to bear the curse for a time, and all of them refused, except his youngest, Puru. After a thousand years of enjoying the sensual company of his wives, Yayati named Puru his heir and retired to the forest. The Vishnu Purana states that owing to the fact that they had refused to accept their father's curse, Turvasu, Druhyu, and Anu received smaller regions of Yayati's domains to rule for themselves.

Genealogy 

Turvasu, Druhyu, and Anu are all described to be the sons of King Yayati. Turvasu is stated to be the king's second son from his first wife, Devayani, while Druhyu and Anu are his first and second sons from his second wife, Sharmishtha. Yadu, the first son of Yayati from Devayani, went on to form a cadet branch named the Yaduvamsha due to being stripped of his heirdom, while Puru, his youngest son from Sharmishtha and eventual heir, continued the main line of the Lunar dynasty, which later also came to be known as Puruvamsha.    

The Harivamsha offers descriptions of the descendants and successors of Turvasu, Druhyu, and Anu:

Turvasu dynasty 

 Turvasu
 Vahni
 Gobhānu
 Trishānu
 Karandhama
 Marutta
 Sammatā (Daughter of Marutta; She married Samvarta, a descendant of Puru, extinguishing the male line of Turvasu)
 Duhshanta
 Sharutthāma
 Ākrīda
 Pāndya, Kerala, Kola, and Chola

Druhyu dynasty 

 Druhyu
 Babhrusena
 Angārasetu
 Gāndhāra

Anu dynasty 

 Anu
 Dharma
 Dhrita
 Duduha
 Prachetas
 Suchetas

See also 
 Amavasu dynasty
 Lunar dynasty
 Yadu dynasty

References

External links 

 Mahabharata 
 The Dynasties of The sons of King Yayati

Lunar dynasty
Mahabharata
Ramayana